The Heavens Are Telling is an album by the multiple Grammy and Stellar award-winning gospel singer Karen Clark Sheard, released on November 4, 2003. In the USA, the album peaked at #3 on the Billboard Top Gospel Charts, #11 on the Billboard Top Christian Charts, #44 on the Billboard Top R&B/Hip-Hop Charts, and #188 on the Billboard Top 200.

Though the previous album, 2nd Chance, performed well on the charts, the slick contemporary R&B production was not openly embraced by Sheard's core audience of traditional gospel music listeners. This release returns to the formula of her hugely successful, well-received and Grammy-nominated first album, Finally Karen, by offering half of the album as a collection of live tracks and half as a collection of upbeat studio productions. Radio edits of the live tracks "We Acknowledge You" and "We Are Not Ashamed (featuring Mary Mary)" were the album's lead singles.

Leaning more toward embracing a contemporary worship audience, Sheard covers two previously popularized songs written by Israel Houghton and Martha Munizzi. In a nod to the mainstream[R&B audience that the previous album's style catered to, Sheard brings her daughter Kierra in on a gospelized live cover version of Jill Scott's signature song, "He Loves Me (Lyzel In E Flat)". It is also on this song that Sheard first commits to recording the self-echoing ad-libs that have become her signature.

This was Sheard's last album for the Elektra Records label, which was absorbed into Atlantic Records in February 2004.

Track listing 
 We Acknowledge You - 5:03 (live)
 We Are Not Ashamed (featuring Mary Mary) - 7:08 (live)
 Glorious (Make The Praise) - 4:33 (live)
 The Heavens Are Telling - 5:52 (live)
 God Is Here - 8:25 (live)
 You Loved Me (featuring Kierra "Kiki" Sheard) - 6:43 (live)
 Go Ahead (featuring J Moss & Missy Elliott) - 3:22 (studio)
 Praise Up (featuring J Moss) - 4:45 (studio)
 I Owe - 4:09 (studio)
 Sometimes - 4:14 (studio)
 Don't Change (featuring Kierra "Kiki" Sheard & J Moss) - 3:45 (studio)

Charts

References

Karen Clark Sheard albums
2003 albums
Albums produced by Missy Elliott